Kägleholm Castle (Kägleholms slott) is a castle ruin at Kägleholm in Örebro County, Sweden. 

In 1541, the estate became a manor and was named Kägleholm. In 1674, Magnus Gabriel De la Gardie  (1622–1686) inherited Kägleholm. The castle was completed by 1680.  The castle burned down in 1712 and was then abandoned.

Gallery

References

Ruined castles in Sweden
Castles in Örebro County